The  Sun Yat Sen High School of Iloilo, Inc. (known as “Tiong San” by its alumni and the Chinese-Filipino Ilonggo community) is a private, Chinese preparatory school at Mapa St., Iloilo City administered by its board of trustees. Its programs are in Chinese and English. Filipino subjects and subjects required by the Department of Education of the Philippines are categorized under the English subjects.

History

Background
Sun Yat-sen was born on November 12, 1866, into a farming peasant household in Choyhung in Kwangtung near the Portuguese colony of Macao. His early education established him as a man of two worlds: China and the West. After a basic training in the Chinese classics in his village school, he was sent to Hawaii in 1879 to join his older brother. There he enrolled in a college where he studied Western science and Christianity. Dr. Sun Yat-sen, the father of the Republic of China, died in Beijing in 1925. Read more: Sun Yat-sen Biography

Philanthropists and civic-minded citizens of the Filipino-Cantonese Chinese community in Iloilo City founded Sun Yat Sen School on November 12, 1925, to honor and perpetuate his spirit of self-sacrifice and love of country.

Early years
In the beginning, there were 28 students. They used the Cantonese Club building as temporary classroom. In 1929, a lot with an area of 1,096 sq. meters was bought by the Board of Trustees of Cantonese Club members of Iloilo City. A two-storey building was erected to house more than 130 students. Another two-storey building was built in 1938. These are the collaborated effort of the Cantonese people in Iloilo City.

The High School department was established in 1939. A science laboratory was put up. Students now numbered more than 300. The school closed when the Japanese invaded the Philippines on December 8, 1941. The Allied forces liberated Panay island in March 1945. By May, SYSHS resumed classes with 370 students.

Post-war era
In 1946 student enrollment reached more than 500 resulting in a lack of classrooms. A three-storey building was constructed to house the high school students.

In the spring of 1949, student enrollment reached 670. By the request of the parents, a senior high school curriculum was added. The student population increased to more than 700. An auditorium was added.

In 1956, a lot of 1800 sq. m. opposite the school along Mapa Street was purchased by the Board of Trustees under the leadership of the Chinese Cantonese Club members of Iloilo City on Aldeguer Street. A two-storey wooden structure was erected to accommodate all the high school students. Iloilo Union Auto Supply owner, Tung Ah Hua, helped developed the project through the members of the Cantonese Club; the president during that time was Liu Chuk Tan. Liu Chuk Tan (Remegio Tse Wing Sr.) was from Thuay San, Guang Dong Province in Mainland China. He was the president for Cantonese Club for eight years during the mid-1960s. His secretary was Chiu Yet.

In 1973, a four-storey building was constructed on the same lot to accommodate more than 1000 students. Another imposing four-storey building with an auditorium was inaugurated on the 60th year foundation of the school in 1985. At this time Kuo Ching Yuan, who was the principal for almost 50 years, retired.

The 80s to the present
SYSHS produced alumni who excelled in academics and sports. The school was a constant topnotcher in the national government examinations since the 1960s. SYSHS was champion in several PRISAA and national sports meets.

In 1962, SYSHS placed first among all private and public schools in Western Visayas and 14th place nationwide in the national government examination for high school graduating students. In the 2000 NSAT examination, SYSHS placed second in Western Visayas and 19th place nationwide.

2000s
Upon assumption of office in 2004, the chairman emeritus, Robert Chua, initiated the major renovation of Tiong San for the school's 80th foundation anniversary.

In 2005, the school had qualified in the GASTPE/FAPE-ESC, a scholarship grant by the government to the private schools to slow the exodus of students from private schools to public ones. Tiong San got an overall rating of above standard for its facilities, equipment, faculty and staff.

In March 2007, Tiong San received a donation in kind from an alumnus, Rhett Cembrano and his family. He furnished all the air-conditioning units in the newly renovated auditorium in honor of his parents: Mr. and Mrs. Chiu Te.

The school year 2009–2010 marked a great milestone for Tiong San. A bridge connecting the two four-story buildings across Mapa Street was constructed through the donation of an alumnus, Samuel Po in honor of his father: Gregorio Po.

The Alumni Association president for 2007–2009, Felix Uy, his family, and siblings put up seed money for the construction of an elevator in the new building going up to the auditorium on the fourth floor.

An avalanche of donations followed from members of the board of trustees and alumni. Both projects were inaugurated during the 84th foundation day celebration on November 14, 2009.

2010s
For the school year 2010–2011, Victorio S. Lo, acting principal until 2004, assumed the office again after Reynaldo S. Navarro finished his term.

Present administrators

 Chairman, Board of Trustees: Henry Chusuey
 Principal: Novee T. Yap

School seal and logo

The seal is a blue inverted equilateral triangle with the face of Dr. Sun Yat-sen placed on top. The words on the seal are marked with a white color.

The triangle bears the name “中山中學” which is the Chinese writing of the school's name. The initials “S.Y.S.H.S.” which means “Sun Yat Sen High School” lies at the bottom with “ILOILO” forming an arch under it. Near the corner of the triangle is a vertically displayed “RP” which means “Republic of the Philippines”.

External links
 Iloilo Sun Yat Sen High School Facebook Page
 ISYSHS logo

Schools in Iloilo City
Chinese-language schools in the Philippines
High schools in Iloilo